The 1992–93 NBA season was the Magic's fourth season in the National Basketball Association. This season held a lot of promise as LSU center Shaquille O'Neal was drafted first overall by the Magic in the 1992 NBA draft. Meanwhile, the Magic signed free agent Donald Royal during the off-season. There were predictions that O'Neal would become the next dominant center in the NBA. Shaq became an instant superstar with merchandising that rivaled only Michael Jordan.

The Magic started to show improvement winning eight of their first eleven games, but then lost six straight afterwards in December, as the team acquired Steve Kerr from the Cleveland Cavaliers. The Magic continued to play .500 basketball with a 24–23 record at the All-Star break. However, the team had various problems with injuries as Dennis Scott only played 54 games due to calf and Achilles injuries, and second-year center Brian Williams missed most of the season due to clinical depression, including a suicide attempt, only playing just 21 games. The Magic finished fourth in the Atlantic Division with a 41–41 record, and lost a tie-breaker for the final playoff spot in the Eastern Conference to the 8th-seeded Indiana Pacers.

O'Neal averaged 23.4 points, 13.9 rebounds and 3.5 blocks per game as he was named Rookie of the Year. He was also named to the NBA All-Rookie First Team, was selected for the 1993 NBA All-Star Game, which was his first All-Star appearance, and also finished in seventh place in Most Valuable Player voting. In addition, Nick Anderson finished second on the team in scoring averaging 19.9 points, and contributed 6.0 rebounds and 1.6 steals per game, while Scott averaged 15.9 points per game, Scott Skiles provided the team with 15.4 points and 9.7 assists per game, and Royal contributed 9.2 points per game off the bench.

Following the season, Kerr signed as a free agent with the Chicago Bulls, while Willliams was traded to the Denver Nuggets, head coach Matt Guokas was fired, and Terry Catledge retired.

Draft picks

Roster

Regular season
Shaquille O'Neal was drafted as the 1st overall pick in the 1992 NBA draft by the Orlando Magic. During that summer, prior to moving to Orlando, he spent a significant amount of time in Los Angeles under the tutelage of Hall of Famer Magic Johnson.
O'Neal had an exceptional rookie season, as he helped the Magic win 20 more games than the previous season, with the team ultimately missing the playoffs by virtue of a tie-breaker with the Indiana Pacers. O'Neal averaged 23.4 points and 13.9 rebounds per game for the season and was named the 1993 NBA Rookie of the Year. O'Neal played in the All-Star game and scored 14 points. On two occasions during that season, each during a nationally televised game, O'Neal dunked the ball so hard that he broke the backboard support units.

Season standings

y – clinched division title
x – clinched playoff spot

z – clinched division title
y – clinched division title
x – clinched playoff spot

Record vs. opponents

Game log

Player statistics

NOTE: Please write the players statistics in alphabetical order by last name.

Awards and honors
 Shaquille O'Neal – NBA Rookie of the Year, All-Rookie 1st Team, All-Star

Transactions

References

 Orlando Magic on Database Basketball
 Orlando Magic on Basketball Reference

Orlando Magic seasons
1992 in sports in Florida
1993 in sports in Florida